A partial solar eclipse occurred at the Moon's descending node of the orbit on Friday, April 7, 1978. A solar eclipse occurs when the Moon passes between Earth and the Sun, thereby totally or partly obscuring the image of the Sun for a viewer on Earth. A partial solar eclipse occurs in the polar regions of the Earth when the center of the Moon's shadow misses the Earth.

Related eclipses

Eclipses in 1978 
 A total lunar eclipse on Friday, 24 March 1978.
 A partial solar eclipse on Friday, 7 April 1978.
 A total lunar eclipse on Saturday, 16 September 1978.
 A partial solar eclipse on Monday, 2 October 1978.

Solar eclipses of 1975–1978

Metonic series

References

External links 

1978 4 7
1978 in science
1978 4 7
April 1978 events